Richard E. Mayer (born 1947) is an American educational psychologist and Professor of Psychology at the University of California, Santa Barbara (UCSB) where he has served since 1975.

He received a PhD in psychology from the University of Michigan (1973), and served as a Visiting Assistant Professor of Psychology at Indiana University from 1973–1975.

Mayer has made significant contributions to theories of cognition and learning, especially as they relate to problem solving and the design of educational multimedia. His best known contribution to the field of educational psychology is multimedia learning theory, which posits that optimal learning occurs when visual and verbal materials are presented together simultaneously.

He is the year 2000 recipient of the E. L. Thorndike Award for career achievement in educational psychology, and the winner of 2008 Distinguished Contribution of Applications of Psychology to Education and Training Award from the American Psychological Association. He was ranked #1 as the most productive educational psychologist in the world for 1997–2001.

Writings
Mayer is the author of more than 390 publications including 23 books on education and multimedia. A selection:
 Multimedia Learning. New York: Cambridge University Press, 2001.  
 Learning and Instruction. Upper Saddle River, N.J.: Merrill, 2003  
 With Clark, Ruth Colvin. E-Learning and the Science of Instruction: Proven Guidelines for Consumers and Designers of Multimedia Learning. San Francisco, CA: Jossey-Bass/Pfeiffer, 2003.   
 The Cambridge Handbook of Multimedia Learning. Cambridge, U.K.: Cambridge University Press, 2005.  
 The Cambridge Handbook of Multimedia Learning Second Edition. Cambridge, U.K.: Cambridge University Press, 2009.

References

External links
Richard Mayer bio, University of California, Santa Barbara

1947 births
Living people
Educational psychologists
University of Michigan alumni
University of California, Santa Barbara faculty
Educational Psychologist (journal) editors
American educational psychologists